Samba Sow (born 29 April 1989) is a Malian former professional footballer who played as a defensive or central midfielder.

Club career
Sow played his first game for RC Lens on 22 May 2009, the season Lens won Ligue 2. He scored his first goal for the club on 15 May 2010 in the 36th minute against Bordeaux, which they won 4–3. He scored in the 95th minute to make the score 3–0 in the Coupe de la Ligue 1st round against Clermont on 22 July 2011.

On 20 June 2017, he moved to the Russian Premier League, signing with FC Dynamo Moscow. He extended his Dynamo contract on 30 December 2017.

On 1 August 2019, Sow signed for EFL Championship side Nottingham Forest on a two-year deal. Sow was a key player for Forest during the 2019–20 season. Notability, Forest had a win rate of 52% when Sow was in the team, compared to 30% when he was not playing. He featured less regularly during his second season at Forest due to a recurring injury problem, and was released following the end of his contract on 1 June 2021.

International career
Sow played his first game for Mali on 27 December 2009, against North Korea in a 1–0 defeat for Mali.

Career statistics

Club

International

Scores and results list Mali's goal tally first, score column indicates score after each Sow goal.

Honours
Lens
 Ligue 2: 2008–09

Mali
Africa Cup of Nations bronze: 2013

References

External links
 
 

1989 births
Living people
Sportspeople from Bamako
Malian footballers
Association football midfielders
RC Lens players
Kardemir Karabükspor footballers
Kayserispor footballers
FC Dynamo Moscow players
Nottingham Forest F.C. players
Ligue 2 players
Ligue 1 players
Championnat National 2 players
Süper Lig players
Russian Premier League players
English Football League players
Mali international footballers
2010 Africa Cup of Nations players
2012 Africa Cup of Nations players
2013 Africa Cup of Nations players
2017 Africa Cup of Nations players
Malian expatriate footballers
Malian expatriate sportspeople in France
Expatriate footballers in France
Malian expatriate sportspeople in Turkey
Expatriate footballers in Turkey
Malian expatriate sportspeople in Russia
Expatriate footballers in Russia
Malian expatriate sportspeople in England
Expatriate footballers in England